Built to Last is an American sitcom television series that aired on NBC on Wednesday evening at 8:30 EST from September 24 until October 15, 1997.

Premise
Set in Washington, D.C., the series centered on Royale Watkins, who put his career on hold to help run the family business, Watkins Construction, after his father had a mild heart attack. Actor Royale Watkin's real-life father ran an actual Watkins Construction in D.C.

Cast
Royale Watkins as Royale Watkins
Geoffrey Owens as Robert Watkins
J. Lamont Pope as Randall Watkins
Natalie Desselle-Reid as Tammy Watkins
Jeremy Suarez as Ryce Watkins
Paul Winfield as Russel Watkins
Denise Dowse as Sylvia Watkins
Richard Speight Jr. as Stanley Taylor

Episodes

References

External links

1997 American television series debuts
1997 American television series endings
1990s American sitcoms
1990s American black sitcoms
English-language television shows
NBC original programming
Television shows set in Washington, D.C.
Television series by Warner Bros. Television Studios